Ropalodontus is a genus of tree-fungus beetles in the family Ciidae.

Species
 Ropalodontus armifrons Reitter, 1913
 Ropalodontus baudueri Abeille de Perrin, 1874
 Ropalodontus camelus Abeille de Perrin, 1876
 Ropalodontus harmandi Lesne, 1917
 Ropalodontus novorossicus Reitter, 1901
 Ropalodontus perforatus Gyllenhal, 1813
 Ropalodontus perrini Reitter, 1878
 Ropalodontus populi C. & H. Brisout de Barneville, 1877
 Ropalodontus strandi Lohse, 1969

References

Ciidae genera